Ashley van Rooi (born 6 April 1988) is a Namibian cricketer. He made his debut for the Namibian team at the African Under-19 Championship tournament of 2007, playing in all five games for the side.

Van Rooi made his List A debut for the Namibian team when Canada visited the country in 2007. However, van Rooi did not bowl cheaply, with an economy of precisely 7 on his debut.

Van Rooi's uncle, Burton, has played with the Namibian team since 2000, and occupies a similar position to Ashley in the Namibian tailend.

Van Rooi made his first-class debut in October 2009, against Free State.

1988 births
Namibian cricketers
Living people